Rhopaloblaste augusta is a species of flowering plant in the family Arecaceae. It is found on the Nicobar Islands in the Indian Ocean, part of India. It is also found in Peninsular Malaysia & Singapore, the Moluccas, New Guinea & the Solomon Islands. In lowland rain forest. It is threatened by habitat loss.

References

augusta
Flora of the Nicobar Islands
Vulnerable plants
Plants described in 1875
Taxonomy articles created by Polbot